Gagea neopopovii is an Asian  species of plants in the lily family. It is native to Xinjiang and Kazakhstan

Gagea neopopovii is a bulb-forming perennial up to 12 cm tall. Flowers look yellow from the front, dark reddish-purple from the rear.

References

neopopovii
Flora of Asia
Plants described in 1975